Matthew Brand is a scientist and artist based in Berlin, Germany. Brand's research focuses on mathematical and computational models of perception, learning, and control, in which each is treated as an optimization problem.  He is best known for working on the following topics:
 Lumography is the shaping of optical surfaces so that a reflected or refracted beam of light produces a pre-focal image when scattered.  The Composites Gallery in New York has a long-running show of lumographic lenses that cast photographic images on walls.
 Specular holograms are three-dimensional images made of thousands of dots of light that glint off of finely carved metal or glass.  The National Museum of Mathematics in New York has a large art installation of specular holograms.
 PQP is a method for solving very large convex optimization problems, particularly quadratic programming, in parallel.  It enables real-time optimal control of extremely fast machinery.
 Incremental singular value decomposition is method for finding and tracking the principal directions of variation in a high-dimensional data stream.  It is widely used in large-scale data mining, including real-time seismic monitoring, analysis of consumer transactions, computer vision, natural language analysis, and machine learning.
 Entropic estimation is a method for revising beliefs when faced with new data.  It combines Bayes theorem and Occam's Razor to find a probabilistic model that minimizes the coding costs of both the data and the model, which in turn has high probability of generalizing correctly.  It is a popular technique in the analysis of bioinformatic data.
 Voice Puppetry is a method for generating lip sync and expressive facial animation from an audio track.  It introduced a synthesis method using Hidden Markov Models that is now commonly used in facial animation.
Brand is also co-inventor of several technologies in image processing, including a method for recomposing photos known as "Liquid Rescale" in Gimp and "Content-Aware Scaling" in Photoshop.

References 

Living people
Year of birth missing (living people)